Colaciticus   is a butterfly genus in the family Riodinidae. They are resident in the Neotropics.

Species list 
 Colaciticus banghaasi Seitz, 1917 Brazil.
 Colaciticus johnstoni (Dannatt, 1904) Guyana , Brazil.

Sources
 Colaciticus

Riodininae
Butterfly genera
Taxa named by Hans Ferdinand Emil Julius Stichel